A marriage settlement in England and Wales was a historical arrangement whereby, most commonly and in its simplest form, a trust of land or other assets was established jointly by the parents of a bride and bridegroom. The trustees were established as legal owners of the assets, and the bride and bridegroom as beneficial owners of the assets during their lifetimes, and after their deaths, beneficial ownership would descend to one or more of the children of the union. The marriage settlement should not be confused with the modern prenuptial agreement, which is concerned mainly with the division of assets after divorce. Such settlements were also commonly made in the British colonies in North America, among families with assets to protect.

Purposes
A marriage settlement was a means of ensuring the proper use of a dowry provided by a bride's father to be used for his daughter's financial support throughout her married life and into her widowhood, and also a means by which the bride's father was able to obtain from the bridegroom's father a financial commitment to the intended marriage and to the children resulting therefrom. It also was an instrument by which the practice of primogeniture was effected by the use of an entail in tail male.

Historic usage
The marriage contract was in common use from the earliest times, and throughout the middle ages up through the 1930s. It is little used today in modern England and Wales due to several reasons, including the disuse of the giving of dowries, the establishment of the legal power of married women to own assets in their own right, following the Married Women's Property Act 1882; the lesser involvement and powers of parents in selecting marriage partners, the abandonment by modern society of the aspiration to establish dynasties, the introduction of death duties, the abandonment of primogeniture as a desirable social model, and the comparatively modern trend of the "working wife and mother", who earns her own money and is often financially independent of her husband.

References

Further reading
"Marriage Settlements in England and Wales", Family Search, article published by The Church of Jesus Christ of Latter-day Saints  
Settlements and entails, University of Nottingham, Manuscripts and Special Collections department
Habakkuk, H.J.,Marriage Settlements in the Eighteenth Century, Transactions of the Royal Historical Society, Fourth Series, Vol. 32, (1950), pp. 15–30, Cambridge University Press

Legal documents
Marriage, unions and partnerships in England
Marriage law in the United Kingdom
Prenuptial agreements